Day by Day (Spanish:Día tras día) is a 1951 Spanish drama film directed by Antonio del Amo. Shot in Madrid, it has certain characteristics similar to Italian neorealism.

Plot 
Two parishioners, Anselmo (Manuel Zarzo) and Ernesto (Mario Berriatúa), seek to straighten out their lives, and Father José (José Prada) helps them, and Luisa (Marisa de Leza), a girl, ends up in love with Ernesto.

Cast
 Julio F. Alymán 
 Antonio Barta 
 Mario Berriatúa 
 Benito Cobeña
 Nela Conjiu 
 Marisa de Leza 
 Manrique Gil 
 Carmen Martín 
 Vicente Mullor 
 Elisa Méndez 
 Amelia Ortas
 Pepe Ortiz 
 Ofelia G. Otero 
 Ramón Oteyza 
 Magda Peiró 
 José Prada 
 Manuel Requena 
 Jacinto San Emeterio 
 Carmen Sánchez 
 Juan Vázquez 
 Manuel Zarzo 
 Vicente Ávila

References

Bibliography 
 Bentley, Bernard. A Companion to Spanish Cinema. Boydell & Brewer 2008.

External links 
 

1951 drama films
Spanish drama films
1951 films
1950s Spanish-language films
Films directed by Antonio del Amo
Films scored by Jesús García Leoz
Spanish black-and-white films
1950s Spanish films